Maple Hill is a mountain in northeastern Sussex County, New Jersey. The Appalachian Trail passes Maple Hill, but does not ascend to the summit. It is part of the New York–New Jersey Highlands of the Appalachian Mountains.

References 

Mountains of Sussex County, New Jersey
Mountains of New Jersey